The Six Mile Cypress Slough Preserve is a 3,500 acre wetland, located in Fort Myers, Florida, which filters rainwater on its way towards Estero Bay.  The preserve contains a 1.2-mile boardwalk trail, interpretive center, and amphitheater.  The slough is a nine mile long, one-third of a mile wide, wildlife corridor, providing a safe way for animals to travel within the Fort Myers city limits.  A 57-square-mile watershed drains into the slough.

The Six Mile Cypress Slough Preserve boardwalk hours are from dawn to dusk year-round. The Interpretive Center hours are from 10 a.m. to 4 p.m. Tuesday through Sunday.

The parking fee is $1 per hour per vehicle, maximum $5 for the day. Lee County Annual Parking Stickers are accepted at this location.

History 
The Monday Group, a Fort Myers high school environmental class, went door-to-door, petitioning that Lee County residents raise their own taxes to purchase and protect the slough as a preserve.  As a result, the students gathered enough signatures for a referendum to be placed on the ballot in 1976.

References

External links
Six Mile Cypress Slough Preserve (Official site)

Wetlands of Florida